Soulanges was a federal electoral district in Quebec, Canada, that was represented in the House of Commons of Canada from 1867 to 1917.

It was created by the British North America Act, 1867. The electoral district was abolished in 1914 when it was merged into Vaudreuil—Soulanges riding.

Members of Parliament
This riding has elected the following Members of Parliament:

Election results

See also 

 List of Canadian federal electoral districts
 Past Canadian electoral districts

References

External links 
 Riding history from the Library of Parliament

Former federal electoral districts of Quebec